The 2022 LIV Golf Invitational Series was the first season of the LIV Golf Invitational Series. The season consisted of seven 54-hole tournaments, featuring 48 players and no cut, and a team championship event at the season end.

Development
On 17 March 2022, the first eight tournament schedule with prize money of $255 million was announced by Greg Norman. The 54-hole tournaments will have no cut and will feature 48 players drafted into 12 four-man teams, with shotgun starts. The first seven events will have $20 million purses with an additional $5 million split among the top three teams each week; a team championship concludes the schedule with a $30 million on offer to the top three players and an additional $50 million in team prizes.

Broadcasting
Currently LIV Golf broadcasts events on its website and on its own YouTube and Facebook pages. Arlo White serves as lead broadcaster with pundits Jerry Foltz and Dom Boulet. Su-Ann Heng serves as an on-course reporter and Troy Mullins is billed as both on-course reporter and influencer for the tour. In July, it was confirmed that David Feherty would be leaving NBC Sports to join the LIV Golf broadcast team.

In the U.S., the organization  attempted to buy time on Fox as its broadcaster, but were unable to reach an agreement. All of the remaining major television networks in the U.S. have ties to the PGA Tour's media rights, and Turner Sports is under the purview of Warner Bros. Discovery, which serves as the tour's major broadcaster overseas, which would effectively prevent them from airing LIV Golf due to its animosity. Likewise, PGA Tour media partners have largely avoided direct references to LIV during golf telecasts, only discussing it from a critical perspective.

Teams

4 Aces GC
Cleeks GC
Crusher GC
Fireball GC
HY Flyers GC
Iron Heads GC
Majesticks GC
Niblicks GC
Punch GC
Smash GC
Stinger GC
Torque GC

Schedule
The following table lists official events during the 2022 season.

Points standings

Individual
Players finishing top-24 at each Invitational Series tournament receive points ranging from 40 (first place) to 1 (21st–24th place), and the player with the most points after the seven regular season events will be crowned Individual Champion. Prizes are $18 million to the individual champion, $8 million to the runner-up and $4 million to third.

Final individual points standings:

Team
Final team points standings:

Money leaders
Final standings of leading players in the money list:

Awards

Notes

References

External links

2022
2022 in golf